John surnamed Galensis, Walensis or  Wallensis (fl. 1215), was a Welsh canon law jurist.

He taught at Bologna, and wrote glosses, on the Compilatio Prima and Compilatio Secunda. On the Compilatio Tertia he made a formal apparatus, of which there are several manuscripts. The glosses fall between 1212 and 1216, because they were used by Tancred of Bologna.

John has been confused with John of Wales the Franciscan.

Notes

Attribution

Year of birth missing
Year of death missing
Canon law jurists
13th-century Welsh writers
13th-century Italian jurists